The American rock band Trapt has released eight studio albums, one live album, one compilation album, three extended plays and thirteen singles. The band is also featured on the video album Crüe Fest. Trapt was formed in Los Gatos, California in August 1995, and is composed of lead singer Chris Taylor Brown, lead guitarist Ty Fury, bass guitarist Peter Charell, and drummer Brendan Hengle.

Albums

Studio albums

Live albums

Compilation albums

Extended plays

Singles

Promotional singles

Videography

Video albums

Music videos

Notes

References

External links
 

Rock music group discographies
Discography